Juan Ángel Sosa (born 5 November 1982) is a Paraguayan football forward who most recently played for Atlético Marte of the Primera División de Fútbol de El Salvador.

Club career
In August 2011 Sosa joined Atlético Marte, but suddenly left them during the 2011 Apertura season.

References

External links
 

1982 births
Living people
Paraguayan footballers
Association football forwards
C.D. Atlético Marte footballers
Expatriate footballers in El Salvador